is a Japanese politician from Ōmuta, Fukuoka.

Having graduated from Keio University, Tōma was elected to the city assembly of Tokorozawa in 1979. She ran unsuccessfully for the Tokorozawa mayoral election in 1991 and for the national lower house election in 1996 before she won the election for the prefectural assembly of Saitama in 1999. Elected as mayor of Tokorozawa in October 2007, Tōma became the first woman to hold that post.

References

External links
Mayor room Tokorozawa city official website
Official website 

Mayors of places in Saitama Prefecture
People from Ōmuta, Fukuoka
Keio University alumni
1949 births
Living people